Killis B. Bonner (1847 - ?) was a farmer and state legislator in Florida. He represented Marion County, Florida in the Florida House of Representatives in 1877.

He was born in North Carolina.

He was elected in 1876. Some House documents use his initials and identify him as K. B. Bonner. He lost the 1878 election for a Florida House seat to Robert Bullock.

In 1881 he gave sworn testimony that Moses Foster Jr. was his brother-in-law and had been prohibited from voting. The testimony was for Horatio Bisbee Jr. in his contested  election against Jesse J. Finley.

See also
Reconstruction era
African-American officeholders during and following the Reconstruction era

References

1847 births
Date of birth unknown
Year of death unknown
Date of death unknown
Members of the Florida House of Representatives
People from Marion County, Florida
African-American politicians during the Reconstruction Era
African-American state legislators in Florida
Place of death unknown